Tengiz Grigoriyevich Sulakvelidze (born 23 July 1956 in Kutaisi) is a former Georgian footballer.

Honours
 International Master of Sports: 1980.
Honored Master of Sports of the USSR: 1981.
 Olympic bronze medalist: 1980.
 Soviet Top League winner: 1978.
 Soviet Cup winner: 1979.
 UEFA Cup Winners' Cup winner: 1981.
 UEFA European Championship silver medalist: 1988

International career
Sulakvelidze made his debut for the Soviet Union on 26 March 1980 in a friendly against Bulgaria. He went on to play in the 1982 FIFA World Cup and UEFA Euro 1988. He scored a goal in a UEFA Euro 1988 qualifier against Iceland.

References

External links
Profile at RussiaTeam 
 
 

1956 births
Living people
Footballers from Georgia (country)
Soviet footballers
Soviet expatriate footballers
Soviet Union international footballers
Soviet Top League players
FC Torpedo Kutaisi players
FC Dinamo Tbilisi players
1982 FIFA World Cup players
UEFA Euro 1988 players
Olympic bronze medalists for the Soviet Union
Olympic footballers of the Soviet Union
Footballers at the 1980 Summer Olympics
Sportspeople from Kutaisi
Olympic medalists in football
Honoured Masters of Sport of the USSR
Medalists at the 1980 Summer Olympics
Expatriate footballers in Sweden
Soviet expatriate sportspeople in Sweden
Association football defenders
Association football midfielders